In philately a killer is a particularly heavy type of handstamp, or portion of one, consisting of heavy bars, cork impressions or other crude devices used to cancel postage stamps. Such handstamps may also be known as obliterators as the mark applied often obscures almost the whole of the stamp.

Killers were often used in the early days of stamps as the postal authorities wished to ensure that stamps could not be re-used.

In the United States this is also the name for a particular circular date stamp with four thick horizontal bars to the right. This handstamp effectively cancels the stamp while leaving the place and date information easily visible. The bars are known as killer bars.

There is no exact definition of what is, and is not, a killer cancel and the term is often used to apply to any heavy cancellation.

References

External links 
 Example of cork killer on cover.
  Image of a killer cancellation on an early US stamp.
Linns refresher course U.S. handcancels prevented stamp reuse by Michael Baadke.
French numeral cancels 1852-1876

Postal markings
Philatelic terminology